This is a list of articles relating to VH1 & Comedy Central Family Poland.

 VH1 (Poland)
 Comedy Central (Poland)
 Comedy Central Family (Poland)

Television channels in Poland